Julio Camejo (born Julio Antonio Sánchez González in Havana, Cuba) is a Cuban Mexican actor and dancer.  He has done several Mexican soap operas.  He is best known for his role of Veneno in the telenovela Contra viento y marea and Francisco in Destilando Amor.

Telenovelas

Reality shows

Series

External links
Official site

Living people
Mexican male television actors
Mexican male telenovela actors
Cuban emigrants to Mexico
Naturalized citizens of Mexico
People from Havana
Year of birth missing (living people)